Jean-Paul Hinako Oulaï (born 19 September 1990 in Abidjan, Ivory Coast) is a footballer defender who is last known to have played for Magwe of the Myanmar National League in 2017.

Career

Thailand

Completed a move to Inter Pattaya, then of the Thai League 3, in 2016.

Myanmar

Arriving at Magwe of the Myanmar National League in January 2017, Oulaï helped them secure the preseason  2016 MFF Charity Cup, the 6th iteration of the competition.

References

External links 
 All hope is not lost -Oulai Jean-Paul ( AS Real midfielder) (Archived)
 Football365.fr Article
 at National-Football-Teams
 Thaileague Profile

Mali international footballers
Malian footballers
Association football defenders
1990 births
Living people
Footballers from Abidjan
Ivorian footballers
Ivorian expatriate footballers
Expatriate footballers in Myanmar
Malian expatriate footballers
Expatriate footballers in Thailand
Expatriate footballers in Mali
Jean-Paul Hinako Oulai
Magway FC players
Myanmar National League players
21st-century Malian people